Edward Hubert Butler I (1850 - March 9, 1914) was the founder of the Buffalo Evening News in 1880.

Biography
He was born in 1850 in LeRoy, Genesee County, New York and attended local schools.

His news career began with the local paper LeRoy Gazette (in Le Roy, New York), then moved on to Scranton Times as city editor and the same position at Scranton Free Press.

Butler moved to Buffalo in 1873 to start the news and later the Bradford Sunday News in 1879.

He was the father of Edward Hubert Butler Jr., who was publisher and editor of the Evening News as well as owner of two local radio stations.

Butlter Sr. married Mary Elizabeth Barber in 1871, who died in 1893.

Butler died in Buffalo, New York on March 9, 1914. His publishing business was left to his son.

Politics

Butler was a Republican and involved in state politics (with the Board of Electors of the State of New York). He was a presidential elector in the 1896 and 1900 presidential elections. He was a delegate to the 1908 Republican National Convention.

Legacy
E. H. Butler Library at Buffalo State College was dedicated in 1950.

References

1850 births
1914 deaths
19th-century American newspaper founders
Businesspeople from Buffalo, New York
Writers from Scranton, Pennsylvania
Journalists from New York (state)
Journalists from Pennsylvania
1896 United States presidential electors
1900 United States presidential electors